A Voz da Póvoa is one of the three main local newspapers of Póvoa de Varzim, Portugal.

Its current editor-in-chief is Ferreira de Sousa.

Newspapers published in Portugal
Newspapers established in 1938
Mass media in Póvoa de Varzim
1938 establishments in Portugal